COP6 may refer to:
 United Nations Climate Change conference#2000: COP 6, The Hague, Netherlands
 (-)-alpha-cuprenene synthase, an enzyme